Haroon Rasheed Dar (born 25 March 1953) is a retired Pakistani cricketer who played in 23 Tests and 12 ODIs from 1977 to 1983. He is currently serving as the chief selector of the Pakistani cricket team.

Early life
As a child he attended the Church Mission School (CMS) in Karachi.

Career

Product of the Muslim Gymkhana in Karachi, he was picked up for the squad but in 1978 he was exposed of the moving ball. But Rasheed showed grit in the Jamaica Test of 1976–77 where most of the top order feared the mighty West Indian attack.

Coaching role

In 1984, Haroon quit first-class cricket and joined United Bank. In 1988 he coached United Bank U19s, went on to be national U19s selector and coach and selected Shahid Afridi who lived near him. Later he was asked to send replacements for the injury hit Pakistan side in Kenya where Afridi was sent & he made historical 102(37).

Incidents

Harood Rasheed escaped a hit and run attack for not selecting a player advised on a phone in 1995.

Harood was pulled out of the car near a Karachi Shopping Centre by youngsters for his slow batting in the 1979 Semi Final.

References 

1953 births
Living people
Pakistani people of Kashmiri descent
Pakistan One Day International cricketers
Cricketers at the 1979 Cricket World Cup
Pakistan Test cricketers
World Series Cricket players
Pakistani cricketers
Karachi Blues cricketers
National Bank of Pakistan cricketers
Sindh cricketers
Pakistan International Airlines cricketers
United Bank Limited cricketers
Punjab (Pakistan) cricketers
Church Mission School alumni
Pakistan cricket team selectors